Nomasikizi Hendrietta Konza is a South African politician who has represented the African National Congress (ANC) in the Eastern Cape Provincial Legislature since 2019. She was the Mayor of Amathole District Municipality from 2011 until 2016, when she was charged with defrauding the municipality; she was acquitted of all charges in March 2019, shortly before she was elected to the provincial legislature.

Early life and career 
Konza was born in 1962 on a farm in Cathcart near the Kei River in the former Cape Province. A teacher by training, she was a founding member of the South African Democratic Teachers Union and was active in the anti-apartheid Mass Democratic Movement.

Political career 
From 1995 to 2019, she represented the ANC as a local councillor in the Eastern Cape. She was the Deputy Mayor of the Cathcart Transitional Local Council from 1995 to 2000 and then served as a Member of the Mayoral Committee in Amahlathi Local Municipality from 2000 to 2006. In August 2010, she was elected Speaker of the Amahlathi council after several other ANC councillors defected to the opposition Congress of the People. 

The following year, after the 2011 local elections, she succeeded Samkhumzi Somyo as Executive Mayor of the Amatole District Municipality. She remained in office until 2016 but was not re-elected in the next elections in 2016.

Fraud trial: 2016–2018 
Months before the 2016 elections, in late May 2016, Konza and several others were arrested on fraud charges; she was released on R15,000 bail. The Hawks alleged that she and other municipal officials had stolen over R2.5 million in municipal funds that had been paid out in 2014 and 2015 on the pretence of sponsoring Miss Amathole Heritage, a local beauty pageant. During the trial, the National Prosecuting Authority argued that she had "bullied" officials into authorising the payments. However, she and others were acquitted on all three counts of fraud in May 2019.

Provincial legislature: 2019–present 
In the 2019 general election, Konza was elected to an ANC seat in the Eastern Cape Provincial Legislature, ranked 20th on the ANC's provincial party list.

Personal life 
Konza has been widowed since 1994; she has two children and a grandson.

References

External links 

 

African National Congress politicians
Living people
Year of birth missing (living people)
Members of the Eastern Cape Provincial Legislature
21st-century South African politicians
Women mayors of places in South Africa